Matheus Leite Nascimento (born 15 January 1983), known simply as Matheus, is a Brazilian footballer who plays as a forward.

He spent most of his professional career in Portugal with Braga and in Ukraine with Dnipro, appearing in 154 competitive games with the second club (48 goals).

Club career

Early years and Braga
Matheus was born in Ribeirópolis, Sergipe. After starting professionally with lowly Associação Olímpica de Itabaiana, he moved to Portugal in the summer of 2005, with second division team F.C. Marco. In January of the following year, however, he was bought by Primeira Liga's S.C. Braga, making four appearances in his first season.

During the year 2007, encompassing both the 2006–07 and 2007–08 campaigns, Matheus served two loans: in January 2007 he joined S.C. Beira-Mar, appearing from August–December with Vitória de Setúbal and being subsequently recalled by his parent club.

In 2009–10, Matheus played all 30 league matches – but rarely as a starter – as Braga finished in a best-ever second place behind S.L. Benfica. He contributed five goals, in 1,142 minutes of action.

Matheus started the following season with major contributions: on 28 July, he scored from a 35-meter free kick to close the score against Celtic (3–0 at home), as his team progressed to the next UEFA Champions League qualifying round (4–2 on aggregate). On 13 August, in the league opener against Portimonense SC, he started and opened the scoring in an eventual 3–1 home win. Five days later, again for the Champions League, he scored the game's only goal in a home victory over Sevilla FC– in celebrating the goal, he pulled out a pacifier and put it in his mouth– and netted the first in the second leg in Andalusia, in a 4–3 win (5–3 on aggregate).

On 23 November 2010, Matheus scored twice in the dying minutes of the 2–0 Champions League home defeat of Arsenal, although Braga would eventually fail to reach the knockout stages of the competition, finishing third in their group.

Dnipro

In January 2011, the 28-year-old Matheus signed for FC Dnipro Dnipropetrovsk in Ukraine, for €1 million. He finished his first full season with seven goals from 23 appearances, helping his team to the fourth position. On 15 April 2014, he netted four times in their 5–1 home win against FC Volyn Lutsk.

During the 2015 UEFA Europa League Final in Warsaw, Matheus collapsed on the field of play in the late stages of the team's 3–2 loss to Sevilla. Manager Myron Markevych confirmed that he had been treated at hospital for a nasal fracture and a head injury, being discharged in good health hours later to reunite with his teammates.

China
On 12 June 2016, Matheus was supposed to join Super League Greece club PAOK FC on a free transfer, signing alongside teammates Léo Matos and Evhen Shakhov. However, the deal fell through and he moved to Shijiazhuang Ever Bright F.C. instead, on a two-year contract.

Relegated in his first season, Matheus remained with the side in China League One, winning promotion back to the Super League in 2019. The following 11 September, on his 100th competitive game, he scored a penalty for the only goal at home to Wuhan Zall FC. 

Matheus left five years later as a free agent, but continued in the country with second-tier Zhejiang Professional FC. He earned another promotion at the end of the 2021 campaign.

International career
In March 2013, after more than two years of living in the country, Matheus indicated that he would be likely to accept a call-up for the Ukraine national team if asked.

Career statistics

Honours
Braga
UEFA Intertoto Cup: 2008
UEFA Europa League runner-up: 2010–11

Dnipro
UEFA Europa League runner-up: 2014–15

Individual
China League One Most Valuable Player: 2017

References

External links

Brazilian FA database 

Official website

1983 births
Living people
Sportspeople from Sergipe
Brazilian footballers
Association football forwards
Primeira Liga players
Liga Portugal 2 players
F.C. Marco players
S.C. Braga players
S.C. Beira-Mar players
Vitória F.C. players
Ukrainian Premier League players
FC Dnipro players
Chinese Super League players
China League One players
Cangzhou Mighty Lions F.C. players
Zhejiang Professional F.C. players
Brazilian expatriate footballers
Expatriate footballers in Portugal
Expatriate footballers in Ukraine
Expatriate footballers in China
Brazilian expatriate sportspeople in Portugal
Brazilian expatriate sportspeople in Ukraine
Brazilian expatriate sportspeople in China